Zathecus graphites is a species of beetle in the family Cerambycidae, the only species in the genus Zathecus.

References

Hesperophanini